Jenni L. Evans is a Professor of Meteorology and Atmospheric Science at Pennsylvania State University, Director of the Institute for CyberScience and President of the American Meteorological Society. She was elected a Fellow of the American Meteorological Society in 2010 and the American Association for the Advancement of Science in 2019.

Early life and education 
Evans studied applied mathematics at Monash University and graduated with honours in 1984. Prior to her PhD, she worked on fluid dynamics and observations of the planetary boundary layer. During her PhD, Evans visited the Naval Postgraduate School in Monterey, California and the supercomputing group at NASA Ames in 1987 and 1988. She returned to Monash for her doctoral studies and earned her PhD in 1990, then joined CSIRO Oceans and Atmosphere.

Research and career 
In 1992 Evans joined Pennsylvania State University. She earned tenure in 1998 and was promoted to Professor in 2005. In 2017 she was appointed Director of the Institute of CyberScience. Her research considers the genesis and decay of tropical cyclones, including the extratropical transition and landfall. She has investigated the impact of climate change on tropical cyclones. She has developed statistical methodologies for forecasts of tropical cyclones and a metric to for cyclogenesis activity in climate change situations. Evans has looked at the relationships between tropical cyclone intensity and organised convection with sea surface temperature, and how these will change with global warming. She has considered how the tropical cyclone boundary layer structures impact the intensity and impacts of convection on the development of African easterly jets. Evans co-chaired the World Meteorological Organization International Workshop on Tropical Cyclones.

Evans has described hurricanes as one of the last remaining weather systems that cannot be predicted.  Evans is a member of an interdisciplinary team charged with reviewing catastrophic risk models used for setting hurricane insurance rates in Florida. Alongside her observations, modeling and statistical analysis of meteorological phenomena, Evans develops new approaches to communicate the risk of natural disasters. She has worked with Mark Ballora on new ways to demonstrate the risks of hurricanes. Evans contributed her expertise in natural disasters and Ballora his background in music, and together they convert data that is typically in charts or graphs into music. Evans monitored the latitude, longitude, asymmetry and air pressure of several hurricanes and convert this into an audio file. Evans has served as Lead Meteorologist advising the Florida Commission on Hurricane Loss Projection Methodology.

In 2019 Evans participated in a National Science Foundation grant to establish the Northeast Big Data Innovation Hub.

Academic service 
Whilst serving on the United States Army Science Team Evans was involved with the relocation of their tropical test facility to Panama. Evans was elected President of American Meteorological Society (AMS) in 2019, which was the 100th year of the AMS.

Awards and honours 
Her awards and honours include;

 1995 National Science Foundation CAREER Award
 2010 Elected Fellow of the American Meteorological Society
 2013 American Geophysical Union Editors Award
 2019 Elected a Fellow of the American Association for the Advancement of Science

Selected publications 
Her publications include;

 
 
 

Evans has written for The Conversation.

References 

Living people
Year of birth missing (living people)
Monash University alumni
Pennsylvania State University faculty
Women meteorologists
American women scientists
American women academics
21st-century American women